The eastern yellow-spotted barbet (Buccanodon duchaillui) is a bird species in the family Lybiidae.

It was formerly considered the only species in the genus Buccanodon, though studies have identified another species in the genus, the western yellow-spotted barbet (B. dowsetti). Prior to the description of B. dowsetti, it was simply referred to as the yellow-spotted barbet.

It is found in Angola, Cameroon, Central African Republic, Republic of the Congo, Democratic Republic of the Congo, Equatorial Guinea, Gabon, Kenya, Nigeria, Tanzania, and Uganda. Populations west of the Dahomey Gap, in West Africa, are now considered to belong to B. dowsetti instead.

References

eastern yellow-spotted barbet
Birds of Central Africa
Birds of the African tropical rainforest
eastern yellow-spotted barbet
Taxonomy articles created by Polbot